is a Japanese professional footballer who plays as a midfielder for Zweigen Kanazawa.

References

External links

2001 births
Living people
Japanese footballers
Association football midfielders
Zweigen Kanazawa players
FC Gifu players
J2 League players
J3 League players